David Evans is an Australian mathematician and engineer.

Evans obtained the degree of Bachelor of Electrical Engineering from the University of Sydney in 1983; and PhD in Electrical Engineering from Stanford University in 1989. He has four other degrees.

From 1999 to 2005 Evans worked in the Australian Greenhouse Office.
There he contributed to the development of FullCam, a fully integrated carbon accounting model for estimating and predicting all biomass, litter and soil carbon pools in forest and agricultural systems for the Australian government. (FullCam, part of Australia's National Carbon Accounting System, received a Special Achievement in GIS award at the 2010 ESRI International User Conference).

He established Goldnerds, an information service for gold investors.  He also serves on the board of advisors for the Committee for a Constructive Tomorrow, a group founded to promote a "positive voice on environment and development issues".  The Committee rejects the consensus of the scientific community on global warming as "alarmist", and Evans has moved from what he calls a "warmist" to a "skeptic" position.

References

External links
 Science Speak
 CFACT

Australian mathematicians
University of Sydney alumni
Living people
Year of birth missing (living people)